Čeněk of Wartenberg (c. 137917 September 1425)  was a commander of the Royalist Bohemian forces at the start of the Hussite Wars. Up until the first half of 1420 he was a commander of the Utraquist League, a moderate fraction of the Hussite movement. As a result of severe atrocities committed by Taborites, members of the more radical part of this movement, he returned to the royalist/Catholic side.

References

External links

Czech generals
1379 births
1425 deaths
Place of birth unknown
Year of birth uncertain
Year of death unknown
Place of death unknown
Date of birth unknown
Czech military leaders
People of the Hussite Wars